The following is the list of cities in Armenia that underwent a name change in the past.

Akhta → Hrazdan (1935)
Aragats → Alagyoz → Tsakhkahovit → Aragats (1950)
Artashat → Verin Ghamarlu → Artashat (1962)
Vasakashen → Basarkechar → Vardenis (1945)
Dadakishlag → Akhundov → Punik
Davalou → Ararat (1935)
Akhuryan → Dyuzkand → Akhuryan (1950)
Geryusi → Goris (1924)
Hamamlou → Spitak (1948)
Jalaloghlou (from Jalalyan dynasty) → Stepanavan (1930)
Ghapan → Kapan (1990)
Karaklis → Kirovakan (1935) → Vanadzor (1993)
Mikhaylovka (1835)→ Karmir Gyugh (1920)→ Krasnoselsk (1972) → Chambarak (1993)
Kumayri → Alexandropol (1840) → Leninakan (1924) → Gyumri (1990)
Kyavar → Novo-Bayazet/Nor Bayazet (1830) → Kamo (1959) → Gavar (1996)
Lusavan → Charentsavan (1967)
Mets Kznut → Nerkin Karanlough → Martuni (1926)
Sardarabad/Sardarapat → Hoktemberyan (1932) → Armavir (1992)
Soylan → Azizbekov (1956) → Vayk (1994)
Nubarashen → Sovetashen → Nubarashen
Hrazdan → Masis (1969)
Uchkilsa → Vagharshapat → Echmiadzin (1941) → Vagharshapat (1995)
Vorontsovka → Kalinino (1937) → Tashir (1991)

References

See also
List of renamed cities in Azerbaijan
List of renamed cities in Georgia

Cities, renamed
 Renamed
Armenia, Renamed
Armenia